Zhao Liying (born 16 October 1987), also known as Zanilia Zhao, is a Chinese actress and singer. She is best known for her roles in television series Legend of Lu Zhen (2013), Boss & Me (2014), The Journey of Flower (2015), The Mystic Nine (2016), Noble Aspirations (2016), Princess Agents (2017), The Story of Minglan (2018), and Legend of Fei (2020).

Early life
Zhao was born on 16 October 1987 in Langfang, Hebei. She graduated from Langfang School of Electronic Information Engineering, a secondary professional training school. She has said of this period: I was born in a village, but it was the experience of rural life that strengthened my strong will and gave me a firm and tenacious personality. It is these experiences that have made me who I am today. So I think it is his strong heart, the persistent pursuit of dreams, the perseverance and steadfastness of the profession which you are engaged in, as well as the calmness and stability when facing the vanity that makes a hero.

Career

2006–2012: Beginnings
In 2006, Zhao Liying participated in the Yahoo Search Star Game and became the final winner. She then signed with Huayi Brothers as a new talent. In 2007, Zhao made her acting debut in the family drama Golden Marriage directed by Zheng Xiaolong.

In 2009, Zhao took on her first historical drama role in The Firmament of The Pleiades. The series was broadcast on Japanese channel NHK and earned critical acclaim. Zhao received the Most Popular Actress award at the Chinese Creative Short Video Awards.

In 2010, first started to gain recognition from mainland audiences after starring in The Dream of Red Mansions (2010), based on the novel of the same name by Cao Xueqin. In 2011, Zhao's popularity rose following her role as Princess Qing'er in New My Fair Princess.

2013–2015: Rising popularity and Breakthrough
In 2013, Zhao starred in historical drama Legend of Lu Zhen, playing an ordinary girl who worked her way up to become the first female prime minister. The drama was a hit domestically, and also overseas in South Korea and Japan, leading to increased recognition for Zhao in the region. Zhao won several newcomer and popularity awards at local award ceremonies. The same year, Zhao starred in historical romance film Palace: Lock Sinensis, the fourth and final installment of the Gong series by Yu Zheng. Opposite to her usual sweet and nice image, Zhao plays a scheming and evil princess in the film.

In 2014, Zhao starred in the romantic comedy drama Boss & Me, based on Gu Man's popular novel Shan Shan Comes to Eat. The series topped ratings in its timeslot in China, and also earned high popularity overseas. 
Zhao further solidified her popularity with several high rated dramas in 2014, including The Legend of Chasing Fish and Wife's Secret. Zhao's soaring popularity thanks to her various successful acting projects led to her being crowned the "Golden Eagle Goddess"  at the 10th China Golden Eagle TV Art Festival, where she performed as the opening act to the ceremony.

In 2015, Zhao starred in xianxia romance drama The Journey of Flower. The drama was a huge success in China, achieving a peak rating of 3.89 and also became the first Chinese drama to surpass 20 billion online views. The success of the drama brought Zhao's career to a greater height. Zhao won numerous accolades for her role in The Journey of Flower, including the Best Actress at the 28th China TV Golden Eagle Award. Zhao was also nominated at the Magnolia Award for Best Actress in a Television Series.
The same year, she starred in modern workplace drama Best Get Going, and wuxia drama Legend of Zu Mountain.

2016–present: Mainstream recognition
In 2016, Zhao starred in action adventure drama The Mystic Nine, playing a sassy and haughty heiress. The series was a commercial success, accumulating over 10 billion views in total. Zhao won the Best Actress award at the 3rd Hengdian Film and TV Festival of China for her role. She was then cast as one of the two female leads, Bi Yao in Noble Aspirations, based on the popular novel Zhu Xian written by Xiao Ding. The drama has over 23 billion views online, the highest record held by a Chinese drama at that time. The same year, Zhao starred in her first war drama, Rookie Agent Rouge.
VLinkage reported that as of December 2016, Zhao's combined dramas' views have reached over 110 billion views, which is the most views by a Chinese actor at the moment.

In 2017, Zhao starred in the Han Han-directed film, Duckweed alongside Deng Chao and Eddie Peng. The sleeper hit was a commercial and critical success. She won her first film award, the Favorite Actress at the Beijing College Student Film Festival. She then starred in the revolutionary drama film Eternal Wave along with Aaron Kwok, about the operation of Communist Party (CPC) undercover agents operating in Shanghai in the 1930s against the Japanese. 
Zhao returned to the small screen with historical action drama Princess Agents, playing a slave girl who rises up to become a powerful female general. Princess Agents was a commercial success both domestically and internationally, and held the record as the most watched Chinese television series at that time. Forbes China listed Zhao under their 30 Under 30 Asia 2017 list which comprises 30 influential people under 30 years old who have made substantial effect in their fields.

In 2018, Zhao starred in the fantasy adventure film The Monkey King 3, playing the role of the Women Country's Ruler. Zhao then starred in the historical drama The Story of Minglan produced by Daylight Entertainment. The drama received critical acclaim and topped television ratings with over 2% in its final episodes. Zhao was nominated at the Magnolia Award for Best Actress in a Television Series for the second time.

In 2019, it was announced that Zhao will star as the female lead in the wuxia drama Legend of Fei, based on the novel You Fei by Priest.

Other activities
In 2016, Zhao was named the tourism ambassador of Hebei. The same year, Zhao became the Vice President of Yi Xia Technology.

Zhao unveiled her wax figure at Madame Tussauds Beijing in May 2017. The same year, Zhao was chosen as a brand ambassador for Dior in China.

In March 2019, Zhao announced her partnership with Hesong Media.

Personal life
On October 16, 2018, Zhao announced her marriage to actor Feng Shaofeng on Sina Weibo. On March 8, 2019, Zhao gave birth to a boy.

On April 23, 2021, Feng and Zhao announced their divorce on Sina Weibo, ending their two-year marriage. They share custody of their son.

Filmography

Film

Television series

Short film

Variety show

Music video appearances

Discography

Singles

Awards and nominations

Forbes China Celebrity 100

References

External links

 Zanilia Zhao on Chinese Movies 
 Zanilia Zhao on Internet Movie Database

1987 births
People from Langfang
Actresses from Hebei
Living people
21st-century Chinese actresses
Chinese film actresses
Chinese television actresses